Boxey is a settlement in Newfoundland and Labrador. Boxey is small town on the south coast of Newfoundland and Labrador. It has been part of the town of St. Jacques-Coomb's Cove since amalgamation in the 1970’s.

Populated places in Newfoundland and Labrador